Ceilândia Esporte Clube, commonly referred to as Ceilândia, is a Brazilian non-professional club based in Ceilândia, Distrito Federal founded on 25 August 1979. It competes in the Campeonato Brasileiro Série D, the forth tier of Brazilian football, as well as in the Campeonato Brasiliense, the top flight of the Distrito Federal state football league.

Ceilândia is the third-best ranked team from the Federal District in CBF's national club ranking, at 169th overall.

History
The club was founded from the Dom Bosco Esporte Clube, which came in 1963, by Francisco da Silva and his wife still in the old Village of IAPI.

In 1971, the governor of the Federal District, Hélio Prates da Silveira created the Invasion Eradication Company, with the purpose of removing those who were called invaders from the noble region of Brasilia, many of them pioneers in the construction of the new capital. It is said that the governor felt depressed to see those favelas so close to the circle of power. As the new settlement was organized by the CEI (Invasion Eradication Company), it was created that was pejoratively called CEI-lândia, linked to the Regional Administration of Taguatinga.

Dom Bosco quickly established himself as one of the greatest teams in the city. The football of the Distrito Federal began to become professionalized again from the creation of the CEUB. In the years that followed, the Campineira was the base of Sobradinho, the Pioneer gave rise to the Taguatinga, but Ceilândia continued from outside. In 1977 appeared the first attempts to professionalize Dom Bosco. Finally, on March 27, 1978, Dom Bosco was registered. Until then the team only existed in fact.

At the suggestion of Mrs. Maria de Lourdes Abadia and then newly appointed administrator it was suggested that the name of the team should change, guarding the black and white colors of Dom Bosco, but changing the shield with an eagle stylized by a stylized image of the water box, symbol of the city. This was how, on August 23, 1979, the team's status was changed by renaming Dom Bosco Esporte Clube to Ceilândia Esporte Clube.

Stadium
Ceilândia play their home games at Abadião. The stadium has a maximum capacity of 4,000 people.

Honours
 Campeonato Brasiliense
 Winners (2): 2010, 2012

 Campeonato Brasiliense Second Division
 Winners (1): 1998

References

External links
 Official Site

 
Association football clubs established in 1979
Ceilândia
1979 establishments in Brazil